In mathematics, specifically in transcendental number theory and Diophantine approximation, Siegel's lemma refers to bounds on the solutions of linear equations obtained by the construction of auxiliary functions. The existence of these polynomials was proven by Axel Thue; Thue's proof used Dirichlet's box principle. Carl Ludwig Siegel published his lemma in 1929.  It is a pure existence theorem for a system of linear equations.

Siegel's lemma has been refined in recent years to produce sharper bounds on the estimates given by the lemma.

Statement
Suppose we are given a system of M linear equations in N unknowns such that N > M, say

where the coefficients are rational integers, not all 0, and bounded by B. The system then has a solution

with the Xs all rational integers, not all 0, and bounded by

 gave the following sharper bound for the X'''s:

where D is the greatest common divisor of the M × M minors of the matrix A, and AT is its transpose. Their proof involved replacing the pigeonhole principle by techniques from the geometry of numbers.

See also
Diophantine approximation

References

 Wolfgang M. Schmidt. Diophantine approximation. Lecture Notes in Mathematics 785. Springer. (1980 [1996 with minor corrections]) (Pages 125-128 and 283-285)
 Wolfgang M. Schmidt. "Chapter I: Siegel's Lemma and Heights" (pages 1–33). Diophantine approximations and Diophantine equations'', Lecture Notes in Mathematics, Springer Verlag 2000.

Lemmas
Diophantine approximation
Diophantine geometry